Anatoliy Yulin (9 March 1929 – 29 August 2002) was a Belarusian athlete who competed in the 1952 Summer Olympics and in the 1956 Summer Olympics.

References

1929 births
2002 deaths
Belarusian male hurdlers
Olympic athletes of the Soviet Union
Athletes (track and field) at the 1952 Summer Olympics
Athletes (track and field) at the 1956 Summer Olympics
European Athletics Championships medalists
Soviet male hurdlers